These are the official results of the Women's 5,000 metres event at the 1995 World Championships in Gothenburg, Sweden. It was the first time at the World Championships that women competed over the 5000 metres distance instead of 3000 metres. There were a total number of 51 participating athletes, with three qualifying heats and the final held on Saturday 1995-08-12.

Medalists

Results

Heats
Held on Thursday 1995-08-10

First 4 of each Heat (Q) and the next 3 fastest (q) qualified for the final.

Final

See also
 1992 Women's Olympic 3,000 metres (Barcelona)
 1993 Women's World Championships 3,000 metres (Stuttgart)
 1994 Women's European Championships 3,000 metres (Helsinki)
 1996 Women's Olympic 5,000 metres (Atlanta)
 1997 Women's World Championships 5,000 metres (Athens)
 1998 Women's European Championships 5,000 metres (Budapest)
 1999 Women's World Championships 5,000 metres (Seville)
 2000 Women's Olympic 5,000 metres (Sydney)

References
 Results
 IAAF official result

 
5000 metres at the World Athletics Championships
1995 in women's athletics